Meterana pauca is a moth of the family Noctuidae. It is endemic to New Zealand. It was described by Philpott in 1910 from two specimens held at the Otago Museum collected in the Wairarapa and a specimen he had collected in Wallacetown.

References

External links

 Philpott in species id
 Specimens held at Museum of New Zealand Te Papa Tongarewa
 Specimens held at Auckland War Memorial Museum

Moths described in 1910
Moths of New Zealand
Hadeninae
Endemic fauna of New Zealand
Endemic moths of New Zealand